Gum tree is a common name for smooth-barked trees and shrubs in several genera:
Eucalypteae, particularly:
Eucalyptus, which includes the majority of species of gum trees.
Corymbia, which includes the ghost gums and spotted gums.
Angophora, which includes the Sydney red gum (Angophora costata)
Black gum, Nyssa sylvatica
Sweetgum, Liquidambar spp.
Water gum, Tristaniopsis laurina

See also
Gum Tree, Arkansas